Cédric Agrain (born 28 March 1985) is a French professional footballer who currently plays as a striker for Championnat National 3 club Trélissac FC.

Career
He played on the professional level in Ligue 2 for LB Châteauroux and Clermont Foot.

References

1985 births
Living people
French footballers
Ligue 2 players
LB Châteauroux players
Clermont Foot players
USJA Carquefou players
Trélissac FC players
Association football forwards
People from Le Puy-en-Velay
Sportspeople from Haute-Loire
Footballers from Auvergne-Rhône-Alpes
21st-century French people